Mohammad Saleem Mughal (born 4 March 1978 in Sheikhupura, Punjab, Pakistan) is a Pakistani cricketer. A right-handed batsman and right-arm off-spin bowler, he played first-class cricket from 1998 to 2014.

His most successful first-class season was 1999-00, when he scored 693 runs at an average of 53.76, with three centuries, including his highest score of 193 for Lahore Division in an innings victory over Hyderabad.

His highest List A score was 133 not out, when he captained Sheikhupura against Public Works Department in 2002-03.

References

External links
 Saleem Mughal at CricketArchive
 

1978 births
Living people
Cricketers from Sheikhupura
Pakistani cricketers
Sheikhupura cricketers
Lahore cricketers
Sui Northern Gas Pipelines Limited cricketers
Water and Power Development Authority cricketers